Prattipadu is a village in the Kakinada district of the Indian state of Andhra Pradesh. It is located in Prattipadu mandal.

Geography 

It has an average elevation of 29 meters (98 feet).

References 

Villages in Kakinada district